Kislyakovo is a rural locality (a village) in Malyginskoye Rural Settlement, Kovrovsky District, Vladimir Oblast, Russia. The population was 64 as of 2010.

Geography 
Kislyakovo is located 13 km northwest of Kovrov (the district's administrative centre) by road. Malygino is the nearest rural locality.

References 

Rural localities in Kovrovsky District